Diego Rosa (born 27 March 1989) is an Italian former racing cyclist, who ccompeted as a professional from 2013 to 2022. He rode in nine Grand Tours and was victorious in the 2015 Milano–Torino.

Career
In August 2014,  announced that they had signed Rosa for the 2015 season, with general manager Alexander Vinokourov highlighting his role as a domestique for Fabio Aru. His first professional victory was the 2015 Milano–Torino. In 2016, he won a mountain stage of the Tour of the Basque Country. He celebrated his solo win by stepping off his bike and crossing the finish line by foot, holding his bicycle in the air.

Rosa has competed in eight Grand Tours. In his Grand Tour debut, the 2013 Giro d'Italia, he finished 22nd overall. After not finishing the 2014 Giro d'Italia, he finished in the top 25 in both the 2015 Giro d'Italia and the 2015 Vuelta a España.

He joined  for the 2017 season.

Major results

2012
 1st  Overall Giro del Friuli-Venezia Giulia
1st Stage 3
 1st  Mountains classification, Giro Ciclistico d'Italia
 3rd Trofeo Franco Balestra
 5th Trofeo Internazionale Bastianelli
 6th Gran Premio San Giuseppe
2013
 1st  Young rider classification, Tour Méditerranéen
 5th Overall Route du Sud
2014
 8th Giro dell'Emilia
 10th Overall Settimana Internazionale di Coppi e Bartali
2015
 1st Milano–Torino
 5th Giro di Lombardia
 5th Strade Bianche
2016
 Tour of the Basque Country
1st  Mountains classification
1st Stage 5
 2nd Giro di Lombardia
 7th Overall Volta a la Comunitat Valenciana
 8th Overall Critérium du Dauphiné
 10th Liège–Bastogne–Liège
2017
 1st  Mountains classification, Tour de Pologne
 5th Overall Vuelta a Andalucía
2018
 1st  Overall Settimana Internazionale Coppi e Bartali
1st Stage 1b (TTT)
2019
 2nd Memorial Marco Pantani
 3rd Overall Tour of Guangxi
2020
 3rd Trofeo Laigueglia
 4th Trofeo Serra de Tramuntana
 5th Pollença–Andratx
 10th Strade Bianche
2022
 Giro d'Italia
Held  after Stages 9–14

Grand Tour general classification results timeline

Classics results timeline

References

External links

1989 births
Living people
Sportspeople from the Province of Cuneo
Italian male cyclists
Cyclists at the 2016 Summer Olympics
Olympic cyclists of Italy
Cyclists from Piedmont
People from Alba, Piedmont